Prince Hermann Ludwig Heinrich von Pückler-Muskau (born as Count Pückler, from 1822 Prince; 30 October 1785 – 4 February 1871) was a German nobleman, renowned as an accomplished artist in landscape gardening, as well as the author of a number of books mainly centering around his travels in Europe and Northern Africa, published under the pen name of "Semilasso".

Life
Pückler-Muskau was the first of five children of Count Carl Ludwig Hans Erdmann Pückler, and the Countess Clementine of Callenberg, who gave birth to him at age 15. He was born at Muskau Castle (now Bad Muskau) in Upper Lusatia, then ruled by the Electorate of Saxony. He served for some time in the Saxon "Garde du Corps" cavalry regiment at Dresden, and afterwards traveled through France and Italy, often by foot. In 1811, after the death of his father, he inherited the Standesherrschaft (barony) of Muskau. Joining the war of liberation against Napoleon I of France, he left Muskau under the General Inspectorate of his friend, the writer and composer Leopold Schefer. As an officer under the Duke of Saxe-Weimar he distinguished himself in the field. Later, he was made military and civil governor of Bruges.

After the war he retired from the army and toured Great Britain, for a year, moving with ease in aristocratic circles. He attended plays at His Majesty's Theatre, Haymarket and Drury Lane (admiring performances of Eliza O'Neill), studied parkland landscaping, and in Wales visited the Ladies of Llangollen in 1828. In 1822, in compensation for certain privileges which he resigned, he was raised to the rank of "Fürst" by King Frederick William III of Prussia. In 1817 he had married the Dowager Countess Lucie von Pappenheim, née von Hardenberg, daughter of Prussian statesman Prince Karl August von Hardenberg; the marriage was legally dissolved after nine years, in 1826, though they did not separate and remained on amicable terms.

He returned to England in 1828 where he became something of a celebrity in London society spending nearly two years in search of a wealthy second wife capable of funding his ambitious gardening schemes. In 1828 his tours took him to Ireland, notably to the seat of Daniel O'Connell in Kerry. On his return home he published a not entirely frank account of his time in England. The book was an enormous success in Germany, and also caused a great stir when it appeared in English as Tour of a German Prince (1831–32).

Being a daring character, he subsequently traveled in Algeria, Tunisia,  Egypt and Sudan and explored ancient Nubia. He is documented as having visiting the site of Naqa in modern-day Sudan in 1837. He also visited the nearby site of Musawwarat es-Sufra, and in both places he carved his name in the stone of the temples. In the same year, at the slave market of Cairo he purchased an Ethiopian Oromo girl in her early teens whom he named Mahbuba ("the beloved"). He took her to Asia Minor, Greece, and Vienna, where he introduced her to European high society, but Mahbuba developed tuberculosis and died in Muskau in 1840. Later he would write that she was  "the being I loved most of all the world."

He then lived at Berlin and Muskau, where he spent much time in cultivating and improving the still existing Muskau Park. In 1845 he sold this estate, and, although he afterwards lived from time to time at various places in Germany and Italy, his principal residence became Schloss Branitz near Cottbus, where he laid out another splendid park.

Politically he was a liberal, supporting the Prussian reforms of Freiherr vom Stein. This, together with his pantheism and his colourful lifestyle, made him slightly suspect in the society of the Biedermeier period.

In 1863 he was made a hereditary member of the Prussian House of Lords, and in 1866 he attended — by then an octogenarian — the Prussian general staff in the Austro-Prussian War. He was decorated for his 'actions' at the Battle of Königgratz, even though the then 80-year old Prince had slept throughout the day.

In 1871 he died at Branitz. Since human cremation was illegal at that time for religious reasons, he resorted to an ingenious evasion of traditional burial; he left instructions that his heart be dissolved in sulphuric acid, and that his body should be embedded in caustic soda, caustic potash, and caustic lime. Thus on February 9, 1871, his denatured remains were buried in the Tumulus - an earth pyramid surrounded by a parkland lake at Branitzer Castle.

Dying childless, the castle and estate passed to the heir to the Princely title, his nephew Heinrich von Pueckler, with money and the inventory to his niece Marie von Pachelbl-Gehag, née von Seydewitz. The literary estate of the Prince was inherited by writer Ludmilla Assing, who wrote his biography and posthumously published correspondence and diaries unpublished during his lifetime.

Artist

As a landscape gardener, he is considered of European importance.

As a writer of books of travel he holds a high position, his powers of observation being keen and his style lucid, animated and witty. This is most evident in his first work Briefe eines Verstorbenen (4 vols, 1830–1831), in which he expresses many independent judgments about England and other countries he visited in the late 1820s and about prominent people he met. Among his later books of travel are Semilassos vorletzter Weltgang (3 vols, 1835), Semilasso in Afrika (5 vols, 1836), Aus Mehemed Ali's Reich (3 vols, 1844) and Die Rückkehr (3 vols, 1846–1848). Andeutungen über Landschaftsgärtnerei (1834, "Remarks on Landscape Gardening") was the only book he published under his own name and was widely influential.

In 2016, the Bundeskunsthalle in Bonn dedicated an exhibition to the eccentric Prince, with the title "Die Gartenlandschaften des Fürsten Pückler". Two of his gardens are listed on the UNESCO Lists of World Heritage Sites: one at Bad Muskau, the other Babelsberg, near Potsdam, and both are considered high points of European 19th-century landscape design.

There are also drawings and caricatures by his hand, but he did not publish them.

Publications
 Briefe eines Verstorbenen (4 vols, 1830-31 (including a description of the Park of Warwick, which influenced strongly Edgar Allan Poe's The Domain of Arnheim)
 Tour of a German Prince, 4 vols, London, Wilson 1831-32 (translation of Briefe eines Verstorbenen by Sarah Austin)
 Andeutungen über Landschaftsgärtnerei[,] verbunden mit der Beschreibung ihrer praktischen Anwendung in Muskau (the only publication featuring him as author), 1834
 Tutti frutti; aus den Papieren des Verstorbenen., 5 vols, 1834
 Semilassos vorletzter Weltgang, 3 vols, 1835
 Semilasso in Afrika, 5 vols, 1836
 Der Vorläufer, 1838
 Jugend-Wanderungen, 1835
 Südöstlicher Bildersaal (on Greece), 1840
 Aus Mehemed Ali’s Reich (on Egypt), 3 vols, 1844
 Die Rückkehr, 3 vols, 1846–48
 Briefwechsel und Tagebücher des Fürsten Hermann von Pückler-Muskau (letters and diaries), 9 vols, ed. Ludmilla Assing, Hamburg 1873–76, Bern ²1971
 Liebesbriefe eines alten Kavaliers. Briefwechsel des Fürsten Pückler mit Ada von Tresckow (love letters), ed. Werner Deetjen, 1938
 Bettina von Arnim/Hermann von Pückler-Muskau: »Die Leidenschaft ist der Schlüssel zur Welt«. Briefwechsel 1832-1844, complete edition with commentary by Enid Gajek and Bernhard Gajek, Cotta, Stuttgart 2001,

Honours

Fürst-Pückler-Eis

His name is still used in German cuisine in Fürst-Pückler-Eis (Prince Pückler ice cream), a Neapolitan style combination of strawberry, vanilla and chocolate ice cream. It was named in his honour by Royal Prussian court cook Louis Ferdinand Jungius in 1839.

In Roberto Bolaño's novel 2666 the dessert named after Fürst Pückler is mentioned as an example of one's reputation being defined unexpectedly by accomplishments of lesser significance.

Orders and decorations
  Kingdom of Prussia:
 Grand Cross of the Order of the Red Eagle
 Knight of the Royal Order of the Crown, 1st Class
 Grand Commander's Cross of the Royal House Order of Hohenzollern
 Knight of Honour of the Johanniter Order
 : Commander of the Royal Guelphic Order, 1st Class
 : Grand Cross of the Merit Order of the Bavarian Crown, 1818
  French Empire: Officer of the Legion of Honour
 : Knight of the Order of St. Vladimir, 3rd Class
 : Grand Cross of the Order of the White Falcon, 22 February 1850
  Sweden: Commander Grand Cross of the Order of the Polar Star, 6 April 1819

See also
 Schloss and park Altenstein

Notes

References

Ludmilla Assing-Grimelli, ed., Pückler-Muskaus Briefwechsel und Tagebücher ("Pückler-Muskau's letters and diaries", 9 vols., Hamburg 1873–1876, reprinted Bern 1971)
Ludmilla Assing, Fürst Hermann von Pückler-Muskau, 1873
Eduard Petzold, Fürst Hermann von Pückler-Muskau in seiner Bedeutung für die bildende Gartenkunst ("Prince Hermann von Pückler-Muskau - his impact on landscape gardening"), 1874
Chevalier Rafael de Weryha-Wysoczański, Strategien des Privaten. Zum Landschaftspark von Humphry Repton und Fürst Pückler, Berlin 2004

External links

 
 
 
 Grove Dictionary of Art

1785 births
1871 deaths
18th-century German people
19th-century German writers
19th-century German male writers
18th-century Prussian people
19th-century Prussian people
19th-century German artists
German explorers
German landscape architects
German military personnel of the Napoleonic Wars
German travel writers
Slave owners
Members of the Prussian House of Lords
German princes
Silesian nobility
Saxon nobility
People from the Electorate of Saxony
People from Bad Muskau
German male non-fiction writers
Lieutenant generals of Prussia
Recipients of the Order of St. Vladimir, 3rd class
Commanders Grand Cross of the Order of the Polar Star
Military personnel from Saxony